José Thomaz Geovane de Oliveira (born 5 August 1985), known as just Geovane, is a Brazilian football forward, who plays for São Caetano.

His previous club is Daegu FC in South Korea, América de Natal and Salgueiro. During the 2010 season, he also played for Grêmio Prudente and Guarani in the Brazilian Série A.

References

External links
 

1985 births
Living people
Association football forwards
Brazilian footballers
Brazilian expatriate footballers
América Futebol Clube (RN) players
Daegu FC players
Mogi Mirim Esporte Clube players
Grêmio Barueri Futebol players
Guarani FC players
Associação Desportiva São Caetano players
Expatriate footballers in South Korea
Campeonato Brasileiro Série A players
K League 1 players
Brazilian expatriate sportspeople in South Korea
Association football defenders